Cosmin Marian Ciocoteală (born 21 July 1997) is a Romanian professional footballer who plays as a as a midfielder for CSM Alexandria. In his career, Ciocoteală also played for CS Universitatea Craiova.

References

External links
 
 

1997 births
Living people
People from Drobeta-Turnu Severin
Romanian footballers
Association football midfielders
Liga I players
CS Universitatea Craiova players